Santa Cruz is a town in Santa Cruz Municipality, in the northern region of the Mexican state of Sonora.

External links 
  Santa Cruz, Ayuntamiento Digital (Official Website of Santa Cruz, Sonora)
  Santa Cruz, Sonora (Enciclopedia de los Municipios de México)

Populated places in Sonora